William Eigel is an American politician who is a member of the Missouri State Senate. A member of the Republican Party, he was first elected in 2016 and assumed his seat on January 4, 2017. Eigel is a former Captain in the United States Air Force, having served from 2009 to 2016.

In 2021, during the COVID-19 pandemic, Eigel called for a special session of the Missouri legislature to implement legislation to prevent private-sector companies from requiring COVID-19 vaccinations for staff and customers.

Election results

References

Living people
Republican Party Missouri state senators
Year of birth missing (living people)
People from St. Charles County, Missouri
United States Air Force officers
21st-century American politicians